Littleton Kirkpatrick (October 19, 1797 – August 15, 1859) was an American Whig Party politician, who represented  in the United States House of Representatives for one term from 1853 to 1855.

He was the son of Andrew Kirkpatrick and the former Jane Bayard, and grandson of John Bubenheim Bayard.

Biography
Kirkpatrick was born in New Brunswick, New Jersey, on October 19, 1797. He graduated from Princeton College in 1815. He studied law in Washington, D.C., was admitted to the bar in 1821, and returned to New Brunswick to begin his practice. He was master in court chancery in 1824, and surrogate of Middlesex County from 1831 to 1836.

He was Mayor of New Brunswick, New Jersey, from 1841 to 1842. His grandfather John Bubenheim Bayard had been elected mayor of the city in 1790.

Kirkpatrick served as a trustee of Rutgers College from 1841 to 1859. He was elected as a Democrat to the Twenty-eighth Congress, serving in office one term from March 4, 1843, to March 3, 1845. He was chairman of the Committee on Revisal and Unfinished Business.

He died in Saratoga Springs, New York, on August 15, 1859. He was interred in the Presbyterian Cemetery in New Brunswick. He was reinterred in Van Liew Cemetery, North Brunswick, New Jersey, in 1921.

Legacy
His wife, Sophia, remained in the city of New Brunswick after Littleton's death. When she died on March 6, 1871, at the age of 68, she named Rutgers College as her estate's residuary legatee.  Rutgers used the proceeds of this bequest to build Kirkpatrick Chapel in 1873.  Today, this chapel is located on the historic Queen's Campus section of Rutgers's College Avenue Campus.

References

External links

Littleton Kirkpatrick at The Political Graveyard

1797 births
1859 deaths
New Jersey state court judges
Mayors of New Brunswick, New Jersey
New Jersey lawyers
Princeton University alumni
Democratic Party members of the United States House of Representatives from New Jersey
19th-century American politicians
19th-century American judges
19th-century American lawyers